The Cowboy Way is an INSP original reality series, filmed in Alabama. It originally aired on the INSP TV network in the US. After its linear run, it was available for streaming on Amazon Prime from July 16, 2016. In November 2019, Roku made the first five seasons available on its streaming platform.

In July 2020, it was renewed for a seventh season, and would contain 12 episodes.

Plot
The reality series follows three modern-day cowboys, Bubba, Cody and Booger in Alabama. The series follows the three building their cattle business, herding cattle and breaking horses. It follows the strict codes of practice, passed down from the days of the Old West.

Main cast
 Bubba Thompson as himself
 Cody Harris as himself
 Booger Brown as himself

Episodes

Season 1 (2016-2017)

Season 2 (2018)

Season 3 (2018)

Season 4 (2018)

Season 5 (2019)

Season 6 (2020)

Season 7 (2020)

References 

Amazon Prime Video original programming
2017 American television series debuts
2010s American reality television series
2020s American reality television series
2020 American television series endings